The 2011 British Speedway Championship was the 51st edition of the British Speedway Championship. The Final took place on 6 June at Monmore Green in Wolverhampton, England. The Championship was won by Scott Nicholls, who beat defending champion Chris Harris, Tai Woffinden and Edward Kennett in the final heat. It was the sixth time Nicholls had won the title, equaling the record held by New Zealand's Barry Briggs.

Results

Semi-Final 1 
  Sheffield
 19 May 2011

Semi-Final 2 
  Scunthorpe
 20 May 2011

The Final 
  Monmore Green Stadium, Wolverhampton
 6 June 2011

See also 
 British Speedway Championship

References 

British Speedway Championship
Great Britain